Le Theil may refer to several communes in France:

Le Theil, Allier, in the Allier département 
Le Theil, Manche, in the Manche département 
Le Theil, Orne, in the Orne département
Le Theil-Bocage, in the Calvados département 
Le Theil-de-Bretagne, in the Ille-et-Vilaine département 
Le Theil-en-Auge, in the Calvados département 
Le Theil-Nolent, in the Eure département

See also
Theil-Rabier, in the Charente département 
Theil-sur-Vanne, in the Yonne département
Le Teil, in the Ardèche département